Ohio's 18th senatorial district  has been established in northeastern Ohio, primarily along the shore of Lake Erie.  It currently consists of Portage County and portions of Cuyahoga, Lake and Geauga counties.  It encompasses Ohio House districts 61, 75 and 76.  It has a Cook PVI of R+1.  Its current Ohio Senator is Republican Jerry Cirino.

List of senators

References

External links
Ohio's 18th district senator at the 133rd Ohio General Assembly official website

Ohio State Senate districts